Tallinn Airport or Lennart Meri Tallinn Airport is the largest airport in Estonia, which serves as a hub for the national airline Nordica, as well as the secondary hub for AirBaltic, cargo airline Airest and LOT Polish Airlines. It was also the home base of the now defunct national airline Estonian Air. Tallinn Airport is open to both domestic and international flights. It was formerly known as Ülemiste Airport.

Since 29 March 2009 the airport is officially known as Lennart Meri Tallinn Airport, in honour of one of the leaders of the Estonian independence movement and the second President of Estonia Lennart Meri.

History

Early development 
Prior to the establishment of the present airport in Ülemiste area, Lasnamäe Airfield was the primary airport of Tallinn, serving as a base for Aeronaut airline. After Aeronaut went bankrupt in 1928, air service was continued by Deruluft, which used Nehatu instead,  from the centre of Tallinn. The first seaplane harbour on the shores of Lake Ülemiste was built 1928 to 1929 in order to serve Finnish seaplanes. The use of this harbour ended in World War II. On 26 March 1929 Riigikogu passed an expropriation act in order to establish a public airport. 10 ha of land was expropriated from Dvigatel joint-stock company and another 22 ha was expropriated from descendants of Vagner. 10 million sents were paid to land-owners as indemnity. Land leveling and renovation works took another 5 million sents.

The building of Tallinn Airport started on 16 November 1931, and the first test landing was commenced by captain Reissar piloting Estonian Air Force Avro 594 Avian, tail number 120. The airport was opened officially on 20 September 1936, although it had been operational a good while before the official opening - LOT Polish Airlines, which commenced its first passenger flight from Tallinn on 18 August 1932 with Fokker F.VIIb/3m from Lasnamäe Airfield, later relocated the flights to Tallinn Airport and in 1935 the airport had 6 arrivals and departures on average every day. In April 1935 a ramp for seaplanes was built on a shore of Lake Ülemiste, together with a small arch bridge and a customs office, which allowed seaplanes to be relocated from a sea port. The same year the airport administration building was erected, which also served initially as a waiting place for travellers. The total cost of the whole airport project, including the cost of building flight hangars, was 25 million sents.

As the very first runways had soft surface, it made them unavailable for takeoffs and landings during spring and autumn seasons. Therefore, only seaplanes stationed at Lake Ülemiste were able to carry out flights, and during winter months, it was possible to use the frozen surface of the lake as a runway for small airplanes. The concrete paved runways of the first stage, inaugurated together with the opening of the airport, were about 40 metres wide and 300 metres long. As they were arranged in a form of a triangle, they allowed takeoffs and landings in six directions. These were the first concrete-paved runway in Estonia, it was needed some 5,396 cubic meters of stone, 4,100 cubic meters of construction aggregate and 137 tons of cement to construct them.

In addition, 3 km of pipeworks was laid for drainage purposes. Before World War II, Tallinn Airport had regular connections to abroad by at least Aerotransport (now part of the SAS Group), Deutsche Luft Hansa, LOT and the Finnish company Aero (now Finnair). On 5 April 1937 the Helsinki-Tallinn-Warsaw-Jerusalem route was inaugurated by Mr. Bobkowski, the assistant of the Polish Minister of Transport. Passengers and cargo numbers grew quickly, from 4,100 passengers and 6,730 kg of cargo in 1933 to 11,892 passengers and 14,726 kg of cargo in 1937. Preparation and design works for a new passenger terminal started in 1938. 14 various projects were submitted for the architectural contest of the new terminal building, with the one from the architect Artur Jürvetson winning the contest in February the same year. The construction costs were estimated at 300 thousand Estonian kroons. The first airplane of then the flag carrier of Estonia, AGO, arrived at Tallinn Airport on 5 October 1939, flying the route Dessau - Königsberg - Tallinn.

As Estonia was occupied by Soviet Union, on 22 July 1940 the order was made by Soviet occupation authorities to transfer the airport to Soviet Air Forces. All aircraft, which were at the airport at that time, including interned Polish Lockheed 14, two Junkers Ju 52 of AGO and PTO-4 trainer aircraft of Estonian Airclub, were relocated to Lasnamäe Airfield.

During the German occupation, regular international connections were announced on 16 October and already restored on 15 November 1941, when Deutsche Lufthansa and Aero O/Y started the route Helsinki-Tallinn-Riga-Königsberg-Berlin. From 1942 to 1944 Sonderstaffel Buschmann was based at Tallinn Airport.

Soviet period
Between 1945 and 1989, Aeroflot was the only airline that served Tallinn Airport.

The construction of the new passenger terminal, which was put on hold due to war, resumed. The building, which was redesigned in accordance with the Stalinist architecture, was finished in 1954 and commissioned on 7 November 1955. Regular flights with jet aircraft began on 2 October 1962 with a maiden passenger flight from Moscow with a Tu-124, which was the latest Soviet airliner. As the terminal built in 1954 became obsolete and unable to cope with growing airport traffic, the construction of the current terminal building began in 1976 and the terminal was opened in 1980, prior to the 1980 Summer Olympics sailing event, which was held in the city. The architect of the new terminal was Mihhail Piskov, who took visual inspiration from traditional Estonian housebarns, and the interior designer was Maile Grünberg. The runway was also lengthened then. The first foreign airline since World War II to operate regular flights from Tallinn was SAS, whose first flight to the airport took place on 25 November 1989.

Modern development

The construction works of the first cargo terminal (Cargo 1), located in the middle of future cargo area on the north side of the airport, were carried out from September 1997 until March 1998. The passenger terminal building was completely modernised in 1999, increasing its capacity to 1.4 million passengers per year and after that greatly expanded in 2008. The growing demand for extra space for cargo operations, created a situation where there was need for cargo terminal expansion, Cargo 2. In order to meet the growing demand for new cargo facilities at Tallinn Airport, the number of cargo terminals was later expanded to four. In year 2012 a new aircraft maintenance hangar was opened and a number of passengers passed two million mark the first time in the history of the airport. On 11 January 2013 the airport was accepted into Airport Carbon Accreditation emission managing and reduction programme by ACI. The year 2013 saw an introduction of an automatic border control system and a start of construction of a new business aviation hangar complex.

2008 expansion

The airport underwent a large expansion project between January 2006 and September 2008. The terminal was expanded in three directions, resulting in 18 new gates, separate lounges for Schengen and non-Schengen passengers, 10 new check-in desks and a new restaurant and cafes. Due to the gallery that connects all the gates and was constructed in the middle of the terminal building the terminal became T-shaped. The projecting terminal section enables a two-level traffic for international passengers. The renewed terminal has nine passenger bridges. The extensions constructed at the ends of the terminal building became additional rooms for registering for the flights and for delivering arriving luggage. Outside the terminal, the apron was refurbished and expanded and a new taxiway was added. The new terminal allows the airport to handle twice as many passengers as it could handle before. The renovated terminal received the award "Concrete Building of the Year 2008" by the Estonian Concrete Association.

Renaming
After the death of former president of Estonia Lennart Meri on 14 March 2006, journalist Argo Ideon from Eesti Ekspress proposed to honour the president's memory by naming Tallinn Airport after him – "" (Lennart Meri International Airport), drawing parallels with John F. Kennedy International Airport, Charles de Gaulle Airport, Sabiha Gökçen International Airport etc. Ideon's article also mentioned the fact that Meri himself had shown concern for the condition of the then Soviet-era construction (in one memorable case Meri, having arrived from Japan, led the group of journalists that were expecting him, to the airport's toilets to do the interview there, in order to point out the shoddy condition of the facilities).

The name change was discussed at a board meeting on 29 March 2006, and on the opening of the new terminal on 19 September 2008, Prime Minister Andrus Ansip officially announced the renaming would take place in March 2009

Baltic Sea cruise turnarounds

In 2011 a new project of cruise turnarounds was launched in cooperation with Tallinn Passenger Port and Happy Cruises. More than 7,000 Spanish passengers travelled that year on charter flights to and from Tallinn Airport. As the airport is located only 5 km from the city center cruise quay, transfer time from airport to cruise ship is under an hour.

In 2012, Pullmantur Air started its charter operations from Madrid–Barajas Airport with three Airbus 321s and two to three Boeing 747s. During the summer 2012 about 16,000 tourists were transferred. The company continued operations in 2013, transferring 25,000 tourists in five turnarounds, as well as there was one partial turnaround operation for the cruise ship MS Deutschland operated by Peter Deilmann Cruises.

In 2015, cruise tourists were attended to by four airlines – Iberia, Iberia Express, Wamos Air, and Vueling. Some 5,000 passengers were expected during three turnarounds for Pullmantur Cruises cruise line. Tallinn Airport served 9,369 cruise turnaround passengers in 2015. No cruise turnarounds are expected in summer 2016 due to construction works, but the airport plans to continue them in 2017.

Demise of Estonian Air
On 7 November 2015, Estonian Air was liquidated following an adverse decision by the European Commission. This meant a significant temporary loss of business for the airport, as Estonian Air had been the largest carrier, accounting for one third of all capacity in 2014.

Future expansion

According to Erik Sakkov, board member of Tallinn Airport, the future plans include expanding the runway by 600–700 metres to serve regular long-haul flights, also building of a brand-new taxiway, new storage facilities, a new point-to-point terminal and expansion of the existing passenger terminal, so it can serve arriving and departing passengers on two different levels. On 21 February 2013 the environmental impact assessment of the airport development project started. The project includes the runway lengthening by 720 metres, installation of the ILS Category II equipment, also lengthening of the existing northern taxiway till the end of the expanded runway, constructing of a whole new taxiway and a new apron area on the southern side of the airport, installation of the new perimeter security systems and constructing of an engine test facility and dedicated snow storage and de-icing areas. Among other benefits the extension would enable planes to fly higher above the city of Tallinn by moving threshold of the runway further from Lake Ülemiste, thus reducing noise level.

The public discussion of the runway extension environmental effects evaluation report took place on 16 December 2013 and the construction work to extend the runway has begun on 1 May 2016. The length of the renovated runway is 3480 meters, the construction contract was concluded with Lemminkäinen Eesti. On 17 November 2016 the airport administration reported, that the runway expansion works are completed, thus the runway became the longest one in the Baltic states. The runway and the main taxiway were extended to the east and a new system of navigation lights was installed. In the summer and autumn of 2016 the construction work caused restrictions on nighttime flight operations but had no impact on scheduled operations. The soil of the safety area around the extended runway was enforced to reduce potential risks to aircraft in the event of runway overrun or excursion. In the course of the expansion work in 2016 some 45,000 tons of asphalt and 4,000 m3 of concrete were laid down, also 60 kilometers of new duct access was built and 100 kilometers of new cables and 400 new navigation lights installed, as well as 10 kilometers of new rainwater removal infrastructure built. The expansion of the airstrip increased the airport's safety area by 41 hectares and five kilometers of new service roads were built. The whole expansion works must be completed by the end of 2017.

On 12 June 2013 the City Administration of Tallinn approved a detailed planning for a 0.91 ha land plot, on which a new  maintenance hangar is going to be built. Total five-year investment plan amounts of more than 100 million euros. The airport is investing €126 million during the 2015–2021 period. The most important project is the reconstruction of the runway infrastructure at cost of €75 million. Additional investment of €2.5 million would be made in flight terminal in order to change its layout and improve the terminal's security, capacity and VIP area. А multi-storey car park for 1,200 vehicles and 150 taxis would be built due to the consistently increasing need for parking spots around the airport. Work on the task and procurement conditions of the parking structure began in 2014. It will be located in front of the passenger terminal and should be completed in 2017 according to current plans. On 10 April 2019, Tallinn Airport announced plans to expand the airport terminal and build an airport city by 2035. The expanded terminal is planned to serve 6 to 8 million passengers per year with an expanded area of 85 000 m2 and 26 gates instead of 13.

Planned Terminal 2
As the airport's current facilities could not serve more than 2.5 million passengers per year and the number of passengers is rapidly growing (38.2% in year 2011), a new terminal dedicated to low-cost airlines is planned to be built. On 12 April 2012 Tallinn Airport announced, that it will build next year a new terminal with five stands for low-cost airlines, which will be easily removable and extendable. The new terminal would be intended for low-cost airlines such as Ryanair, Easyjet and Norwegian that do not want to pay that much to the airport and do not need many airport services. The new terminal is intended for the service of one million passengers and the space previously occupied by low-cost airlines would pass into the disposition of Nordica and other traditional airlines.

Facilities
There are one passenger terminal and four cargo terminals at the airport. These are located to the right of Runway 08's threshold, with Runway 26 being connected to the terminal segment by a parallel taxiway as long as the runway.

Terminal building
Estonian EXPO Center year-round permanent exhibition is located near the Gate 3, acting as a live advertising space where promotion representatives introduce the companies taking part in the exhibition and help finding cooperation partners in particular fields of business. The center was opened on 22 July 2010. VKG has opened an oil shale themed exposition at Gate 4 on 9 January 2013, showing the history and development of Estonian oil shale industry. The Estonian Tourist Board has opened a brand new "Visit Estonia" themed exposition at Gate 5 on 2 October 2013. The gate is divided into three parts: a children's territory with a Lotte-themed playhouse, an interactive, informative waiting area decorated with Estonian national patterns and a bridge from the gate to the airplane that introduces travellers to Estonian nature.

Passenger facilities

A lending library was open on 9 May 2013 in a special area by Gate 1. All books were donated by public including Estonian president Toomas Hendrik Ilves and the First Lady of Estonia Evelin Ilves. The library will have books in ten different languages, the majority being in Estonian, Russian and English. There will also be a selection of children's books. On 16 August 2013 Tallinn Airport unveiled a gallery and started exhibiting artists' work in the Passenger Terminal. The gallery of rotating exhibitions on the 1st floor of the Passenger Terminal is open to all arriving and departing passengers as well as those seeing them off or meeting them.

On 1 September 2013, the airport opened an automatic border control system, that should accelerate procedures for passengers travelling out of the Schengen area. The fully automated border crossing system consists of two automated gates and six registering kiosks.

The Nordea Lounge services business class passengers of Aeroflot, Air Baltic, Finnair, Flybe, LOT Polish Airlines, Lufthansa and SAS, as well as Priority Pass and members of the Metropolis loyalty programme.

Additional Tallinn Airport GH check-in terminal is located at the Radisson Blu Hotel Tallinn. Travellers can check in online and print boarding cards directly from the lobby. The system allows to check in 24 hours before departure and choose own specific seat.

Airport museum and activity centre
The museum is located in a small building near the terminal, also a relatively large area nearby will be transformed into open-air exhibition. Two ancient cult stones, which it is necessary to move during the expansion of the runway, will be transferred to that exhibition. The whole museum plot will be separated from the airfield. The museum will have a direct access from E263 motorway (shares the same route with Estonian main road 2). Additionally, a platform with a view onto the runway will be constructed, giving good possibilities for aircraft spotting. The activity centre opened in 2016.

Business aviation hangar complex
On 20 March 2013 the airport authorities announced a public procurement for constructing a new hangar complex.
The cornerstone of the new complex was laid on 27 September 2013. The complex is intended for accommodating a total of nine planes, eight of them are mid-size business jets and one aircraft the size of a large corporate aircraft. It consists of five hangars: the Hangar 1 for the large aircraft (such as Boeing 737, Airbus A318 or Airbus A319), hangars 2 to 5 are intended for smaller business jets (Bombardier Challenger 605, Learjet 60). The whole complex was opened on 15 April 2014 and its operator is Panaviatic, which is going to expand its business jet operations from Tallinn Airport. Apart from providing hangarage for business jets, the new complex also offers MRO services by Panaviatic's subsidiary AS Panaviatic Maintenance. The total investment was close to 5 million euros and the whole complex is the largest in the Baltic states.

Aviation services

Magnetic MRO has its facilities and headquarters on the airport property. On 6 September 2012 the company opened a new  column-free three-bay hangar for Base Maintenance works of narrow-body aircraft, such as Boeing 737 and Airbus A320. The company has in total three main Base Maintenance lines, and two additional lines for lighter checks and modification works. With the addition of the new hangar, the maximum annual line maintenance capacity of the company boosted to 72 aircraft from the present 24. Magnetic MRO said the new hangar will allow it carry out a planned doubling of its workforce. On 21 December 2015 Magnetic MRO announced a launch of the second painting hangar, which will be built in co-operation with Tallinn Airport, in response to growing demand for painting services. The new  hangar with further expansion possibilities will be capable of housing aircraft in size up to Boeing 737 MAX 9 and Airbus A321neo, as well as regional aircraft, and according to the agreement, the hangar is planned to be finalized and ready for use by 1 June 2017.

Air freight
Tallinn Airport has 4 cargo terminals with total warehouse space of ca 11,600 m2. The size of warehouse in Cargo 1 is 3601 m2 and 2066 m2 are dedicated for the office area. Cargo terminal is operated by different operators (including integrators) and Tallinn Airport Ltd. only acts as a lessor. The size of Cargo 2 warehouse is 1255 m2 and 758 m2 are dedicated for office space. Cargo 2 is operated by TNT Express Worldwide. Other logistics operators include DHL, UPS and FedEx.

Airlines and destinations

Passenger
The following airlines operate scheduled year-round or seasonal routes at Tallinn Airport:

Cargo

Statistics
Total passengers using the airport has increased on average by 14.2% annually since 1998. On 16 November 2012 Tallinn Airport has reached two million passenger landmark for the first time in its history. Passenger data reflects international and domestic flights combined, share of domestic flights compared to international flights was marginal. Passenger and cargo numbers exclude direct transit.

Busiest routes

Most frequent routes

Accolades

Ground transportation

Tram

The best connection between downtown Tallinn and the airport is provided by tramline "4". The tram network extension to the airport terminal was opened on 1 September 2017. Trams mostly go with 6-minute intervals, the journey from downtown to the airport (and vice versa) takes 18–19 minutes. Trams run through the 150-metre long Ülemiste tram tunnel beneath the Tallinn-Narva railway. Like all public transportation in Tallinn, the tram is free to the city's residents.

Bus
The line "2" offers a connection to Mõigu subdistrict of Tallinn(Mõigu is located 1–2 km southeast from airport towards Tartu). On the returning route from Mõigu to Tallinn downtown (and further to Tallinn Passenger Port) the line "2" stops in Tartu Road (on the other side of parking house, not in public transportation terminal (or tram terminal)). Therefore, when going to city centre it is more convenient (easier) to take tram than bus "2". The line "2" buses go mostly with 20-minute intervals.

The line "49" provides connections to Viimsi Parish, as well as to Iru subdistrict, Iru village and Pirita and Lasnamäe districts.

The line "65" provides a connection to Lasnamäe district.

Long-distance services include:
 intercity bus line "Täistunniekspress", operated by Lux Express, departs from Tallinn to Tartu. "Täistunniekspress" from Tartu arrives at the airport.
 intercity bus line "158", operated by SEBE, stops at the airport once a day. and departs from Tallinn to Tartu. The bus stops at Kose crossroad and the Mäo and Puhu crossroads.

Rail
The nearest station is Ülemiste train station, which lies about 800 metres from the airport, near Ülemiste Keskus. It provides access to regional rail and commuter rail lines of Elron. The station and Tallinn Airport are connected through the bus lines "49" and "65" and the tram line "4".

Highway
The airport is accessed by the E263 expressway (which shares the same route with the Estonian national road T2). The E67 expressway (Via Baltica, follows the Estonian national road T4) is easily accessible via the  dual carriageway Järvevana Road, which provides a direct connection with E263 at the intersection.

Incidents and accidents
 On 6 September 1938 at 5 p.m. The crash was caused by an error by the pilot, who misestimated the altitude during low-flight manoeuvres, and by muggy weather, which complicated the detection of a water surface. The depth of the crash site was only about 1 metre, which helped to absorb the shock but was too shallow for the pilot to drown. The pilot survived with head injuries. The plane's propeller and landing gear was damaged in the crash, but the plane was recovered and repaired by the staff of the seaplane terminal.
 On 8 January 1954, an Aeroflot Lisunov Li-2 flying from Tallinn to Leningrad-Shosseynaya Airport was hijacked by a man in a Soviet Air Force uniform and a woman. Both had guns and the woman had a knife. The flight engineer attempted to overpower the hijackers, but was killed by gunfire. Other crew members did succeed in overpowering the two. The aircraft turned back to Tallinn.
 In January 1966, an Ilyushin Il-14 flying from Kuressaare to Tallinn, made a landing on ice of Lake Ülemiste short of the runway 08 at its destination in nearly zero-visibility conditions. The incident was caused by an error of the air traffic controller, who misestimated the plane's altitude. The frontal landing gear was damaged during the unexpected landing, but the plane was otherwise intact. It was towed the same day to the airport. No injuries were reported, the passengers walked to the terminal across the frozen lake.
 On 16 November 1990, an Aeroflot Tupolev Tu-134 flying from Tallinn to Moscow was hijacked during a domestic flight by a hijacker who demanded to be taken to Sweden. The aircraft with 64 passengers aboard returned and landed at Tallinn Airport. Upon landing, the hijacker was arrested by Soviet authorities. No casualties were reported.
 On 18 September 1991 at 14:30 EEST (11:30 UTC), a Euro-Flite Dassault Falcon 20 business jet, carrying 2 crew and 10 passengers, landed on the runway of Tallinn Airport with its right main gear failed to lock in its extended position. The captain used ailerons and wheel brakes to hold the aircraft on the runway as far as possible until most speed was lost. Thereafter the aircraft came down smoothly on its right wing-tip while continuing to move turning to the right. At the end of the landing run the aircraft left the runway and stopped about 8 m outside the runway edge. There was no fire. The aircraft involved was OH-FFA and it got substantial damage, but was later repaired. The flight had departed from Helsinki Airport with Tallinn as its destination. No injuries were reported.
 On 20 February 1993 Aeroflot Flight 2134, a Tupolev Tu-134 flying from Tyumen to St. Petersburg, was hijacked during a domestic flight by a hijacker who demanded to be taken to the United States. As there were not enough fuel, he initially demanded to be taken to Helsinki, but agreed to land in Tallinn Airport. After the landing and five and half hours of negotiations 30 passengers were released. The plane then departed and next landed to Stockholm Arlanda Airport, where the hijacker, who was accompanied by his wife and child, peacefully surrendered to Swedish authorities.
 On 24 November 1994 a Komiavia Tupolev Tu-134 flying from Syktyvkar Airport to Pulkovo Airport was hijacked by group of three hijackers, who demanded to be taken to Denmark. They surrendered after landing in Tallinn Airport and several hours of negotiations.
 On 10 February 2003 an Enimex Antonov An-28 crashed while heading to Helsinki Airport during a regular cargo flight. The aircraft banked right during climb and crashed nose down into some trees shortly after takeoff, 300 metres from Tallinn Airport. The aircraft involved was ES-NOY. The captain and first officer were killed during the crash, while a flight engineer was injured.
 On 27 March 2006 an Airest Let L-410UVP-E20C caught fire while standing in Tallinn Airport. The aircraft involved was ES-LLG, it received substantial damage, but was later repaired. No injuries were reported.

 On 18 March 2010 an Exin Antonov An-26 aircraft made an emergency landing on the frozen Lake Ülemiste, close to Lennart Meri Tallinn Airport. Initial reports indicated problems with the landing gear and one of the engines. The flight was operated by Exin on behalf of DHL. The aircraft involved was SP-FDO and the flight had departed from Helsinki Airport. Two of the six crew members were injured. The wrecked plane was later towed to the parking position near the main taxiway and used for rescue trainings until 5 June 2015, when it was partly disassembled and transferred to the search and rescue school in Väike-Maarja. The airport plans to buy another used plane to continue trainings on site.
 On 25 August 2010 an Exin Antonov An-26 aircraft made an emergency landing on the runway of Lennart Meri Tallinn Airport. Initial reports indicated problems with the landing gear during takeoff. The flight was operated by Exin on behalf of DHL. The aircraft involved was SP-FDP and the flight was scheduled to fly to Helsinki Airport. None of the four crew members were injured.
 On 8 February 2013 an ULS Airlines Cargo Airbus A300B4 aircraft skidded off the taxiway during taxiing following a normal landing. All flight operations were cancelled for two and a half hours, except those of planes with shortened takeoff and landing capability, which do not require the whole length of the runway and were cleared for takeoff. Planes en route to Tallinn were redirected to Helsinki and Riga. The aircraft involved was TC-KZV and the flight had departed from Istanbul–Sabiha Gökçen Airport. No injuries were reported.
 On 14 August 2014 an Estonian Air Bombardier CRJ900NG aircraft made an emergency landing on the runway of Lennart Meri Tallinn Airport. The plane, carrying 86 people, was forced to land at Tallinn Airport shortly after takeoff because of left hand main gear tyre was blown on takeoff at 18:10. After airport crews scoured the runway and found tire debris, the pilots were alerted. After burning off most of its fuel, the plane touched down without incident in Tallinn at around 20:30. The aircraft involved was ES-ACC and the flight was scheduled to fly to Amsterdam Airport Schiphol. No injuries were reported.
 On 11 July 2015 at 5:12 a.m. EEST (02:12 UTC) an Aviastar-TU Tupolev Tu-204 aircraft arriving from Novosibirsk Tolmachevo Airport blew two of its right hand main gear tyres after landing. No damage to the runway or injuries were reported. The plane was towed to a parking position for repairs.
 On 28 February 2018 a Smartlynx Airlines Airbus A320-214 made an emergency landing 150 meters from the runway during a touch-and-go landing exercise. After a successful runway approach, the aircraft was unable to regain altitude and collided with the runway. During the collision, the aircraft's engines touched the runway, and the covering flaps of the aircraft's main landing gear fell apart. The aircraft managed to regain altitude after the collision and turn back to make a landing, but after the turn both engines stopped. The pilot made an emergency landing about 150 meters from the runway, stopping at about 15 meters south of the runway. All of the aircraft's tires broke in the course of the training. The instructor and one of the students sustained mild injuries as a result of the accident.
 On 4 June 2019 a Nordica Bombardier CRJ900NG aircraft made an emergency landing on the runway of Lennart Meri Tallinn Airport. The plane, carrying 31 passengers and five crew members, landed at Tallinn Airport at 18:07 with one of its tyres blown. All flight operations at the airport were cancelled until 18:38. According to the spokesperson of Nordica, the plane tyre become damaged during a takeoff in Kyiv. The aircraft involved was ES-ACC and the flight had departed from Boryspil International Airport. No injuries were reported.

See also
 List of the busiest airports in the Baltic states
 List of the busiest airports in the former USSR
 Transport in Estonia

References

External links

 Official website
 Tallinn Airport GH official website
 
 

Airports in Estonia
Airports established in 1936
Soviet Air Force bases
Soviet Air Defence Force bases
1936 establishments in Estonia
Airport
Buildings and structures in Tallinn
1930s establishments in Estonia
International airports in Estonia